Subrahmanyan Ramassamy (5 June 1939 – 15 May 2017) was an Indian politician who was the fourth Chief Minister of the Union Territory of Puducherry, then Pondicherry. He served 3rd Assembly from 6 March 1974 to 28 March 1974 and 4th Assembly from 2 July 1977 to 12 November 1978.

Political career 

Ramaswamy started his political career in Dravida Munnetra Kazhagam and became the Home Minister of Pondicherry in the Dravida Munnetra Kazhagam - Communist Party of India coalition ministry from 1969 to 1973 but soon after shifted his allegiance to the All India Anna Dravida Munnetra Kazhagam in 1973 a Party founded by M. G. Ramachandran in 1972 as a breakaway faction of the Dravida Munnetra Kazhagam.

In 1974 Pondicherry Legislative Assembly election, All India Anna Dravida Munnetra Kazhagam - Communist Party of India coalition came to power, and Ramaswamy was made Chief Minister for a brief period. He was again sworn in as Chief Minister in 1977 that lasted in office for a little over one year. He successfully contested as Independent from Karaikal in 1985. Later, Ramaswamy joined Congress in 1992.

Electoral history
Member of the Legislative Assembly

1939 births
2017 deaths
Chief ministers of Puducherry
Chief ministers from All India Anna Dravida Munnetra Kazhagam
All India Anna Dravida Munnetra Kazhagam politicians
Puducherry politicians

Notes